NGC 4497 is a lenticular galaxy located about 60 million light-years away in the constellation Virgo. NGC 4497 was discovered by astronomer William Herschel on March 15, 1784. It was rediscovered by astronomer Arnold Schwassmann on November 8, 1900 and was listed as IC 3452. NGC 4497 is a member of the Virgo Cluster.

See also
 List of NGC objects (4001–5000)
 Lenticular galaxy

References

External links

Virgo (constellation)
Lenticular galaxies
4497
IC objects
41457
7665
Astronomical objects discovered in 1784
Virgo Cluster
Discoveries by William Herschel